El Pangui Canton is a canton of Ecuador, located in the Zamora-Chinchipe Province.  Its capital is the town of El Pangui.  Its population at the 2001 census was 7,441.

References

Cantons of Zamora-Chinchipe Province